Snowdrop is a proprietary game engine created by Massive Entertainment and Ubisoft for use on Microsoft Windows, PlayStation 4, PlayStation 5, Xbox One, Xbox Series X/S, Nintendo Switch, Stadia, and Amazon Luna. It was revealed at E3 2013 with Tom Clancy's The Division, the first game using the engine.

Technology
The engine is coded mainly in C++.

Rodrigo Cortes, former brand art director at Massive Entertainment, says that the development on Snowdrop engine started in 2009 by Massive Entertainment. Initially it was an engine built for PC and next-gen development to "do things better not bigger". The core of the game engine is powered by a "node-based system" and the engine is a dynamic, interconnected and flexible system where developers can create their assets quickly and interact with them in ways that have never been done before. Massive created a lighting and destruction system inspired by film production techniques.

Features

 Node-based scripting system that links all areas, from rendering, AI, mission scripts to UI.
 Realistic day and night change.
 Global volumetric lighting.
 Procedural destruction.
 Advanced particle system and visual effects.
 Dynamic material shader

Games using Snowdrop

References

2016 software
Ubisoft
Video game engines